(Weilburg schloss concerts) is the name of an annual summer music festival held in and around Schloss Weilburg in Weilburg, Hesse, Germany. The festival of regional importance was founded in 1972 and presents around 40 concerts of classical music in June and July.

Hans Koppenburg (1932–2013). a conductor from Frankfurt, was artistic director from 1972 to 1978, succeeded by Karl Rarich in 1980. The present director is Stephan Schreckenberger, who has shaped the program from 2011. Some of the concerts are aired throughout Europe. The hr-Sinfonieorchester and the hr-Bigband perform regularly at the festival.

External links 
 

Classical music festivals in Germany
Music festivals established in 1972
1972 establishments in West Germany